The New Zealand Castrol Six Hour Race was an endurance motorcycle race that was held for fifteen years at Manfeild, Palmerston North from 1974 to 1988. Many of New Zealand's top international riders competed at the Six Hour race; winners included Dave Hiscock (5-time winner), Neil Chivas (4-time winner), Graeme Crosby (3-time winner), Aaron Slight (2-time winner), and Ginger Molloy (first winner).  The race was characterised by its exclusive use of unmodified standard production motorcycles and a running start where the racers had to run to their machines before they could start. There was special provisions that the machines were no older than 3 years old, which was a boon to the motorcycle industry in New Zealand at the time which saw a dramatic rise in the sale of Motorcycles after these events.

Winners
 1974: Ginger Molloy (solo) – Kawasaki Z1-A
 1975: Graeme Crosby (solo) – Kawasaki Z1-B
 1976: Graeme Crosby (solo) – Kawasaki Z1000
 1977: Graeme Crosby and Tony Hatton – Kawasaki Z1000
 1978: Dave Hiscock and Neil Chivas – Suzuki GS1000EN
 1979: Dave Hiscock and Neil Chivas – Suzuki GSX1100ET
 1980: Dave Hiscock and Neil Chivas – Suzuki GSX1100T (Black Pipe)
 1981: Malcolm Campbell and Mick Cole – Honda CB1100R
 1982: Dave Hiscock and Neville Hiscock – Suzuki GSX1100SXZ Katana
 1983: Bill Biber and Phil Payne – Honda VF750F
 1984: Alan DeLatour and Dave Martin – Honda VF1000F
 1985: Dave Hiscock and Neil Chivas – Suzuki GSX-R750F
 1986: Aaron Slight and Rob Doran – Yamaha FZ750
 1987: Aaron Slight and Wayne Clark – Yamaha FZR1000
 1988: Tony Rees and Dave Hicks – Yamaha FZR1000

Information from

References 

Motorcycle races
Motorsport competitions in New Zealand
Motorcycle racing in New Zealand